ARA Presidente Sarmiento is a museum ship in Argentina, originally built as a training ship for the Argentine Navy and named after Domingo Faustino Sarmiento, the seventh President of Argentina. She is considered to be the last intact cruising training ship from the 1890s.

History 
The ship was originally built for the Argentine Naval Academy. ARA Presidente Sarmiento made thirty seven annual training cruises including six circumnavigations of the globe. The ship was retired as a seagoing vessel in 1938, but continued to serve without sails on Argentine rivers around 1950 and as a stationary training ship until 1961.

She is now maintained in her original 1898 appearance as a museum ship in Puerto Madero near downtown Buenos Aires.

Propulsion and auxiliaries

Rigging

Engine 
In addition to its sailing rig this ship includes a large triple expansion steam engine supplied by two coal-fired boilers exhausting through the rear stack. An additional auxiliary boiler exhausting through the forward stack provides steam for other than propulsion, including two engines driving electrical generators on the main deck (below the weather deck).

Fuel
A single coal bunker is positioned between the main and auxiliary boiler rooms

Steering

A three-wheel chain drive allows up to six helmsmen to control the rudder. Such a crew of operators was not always required due to the inclusion of an electric servo-drive for normal operation but was useful for the training of cadets.

Armament

Artillery 

Four Armstrong gun mounts are positioned amidships, two on each side, with additional smaller weapons. The museum information indicates those as 5-inch pieces, but Norman Friedman identifies those as 120-mm L45 Elswick Pattern Y. Documentation on the ship shows these having had some armor, but the present installations are bare.

Torpedoes 
A single torpedo scuttle using gravity expulsion exited at the bow. The scuttle has been removed and the exit port welded shut, but in the current museum configuration a torpedo is suspended in a position on the main deck ready to enter the former scuttle entrance. Additional torpedo storage is provided below this main deck.

Historic images

Museum
It is moored in Puerto Madero close to the Bicentennial Plaza and is now the ARA Presidente Sarmiento Frigate Museum.

See also

ARA Uruguay, a smaller historic tall ship moored nearby in basin number three.
Argentine peso moneda nacional; the ship was featured on the 5 peso coin from 1961 to 1968.

References

Notes

Bibliography

External links

 Google Maps location of the Presidente Sarmiento

Google translation of above

Ships built on the River Mersey
1897 ships
Training ships of the Argentine Navy
Tall ships of Argentina
Museum ships in Argentina
Full-rigged ships
Museums in Buenos Aires
Naval museums
National Historic Monuments of Argentina
Auxiliary cruisers
Argentina–United Kingdom military relations